Erskine is a town in Scotland.

Erskine may also refer to:

Places

Australia 
 Erskine, South Australia
 Erskine, Western Australia
 Erskine Island, Queensland
 Erskine Valley, Lord Howe Island, New South Wales
 Erskine Park, New South Wales
 Erskineville, New South Wales

United States 
 Erskine, Minnesota
 Erskine, Oregon
 Erskine, West Virginia

Elsewhere 
 Erskine, Alberta, Canada
 Mount Erskine, Penang, Malaysia

People
Erskine (surname), including a list of people with the surname
Clan Erskine, a Lowland Scottish clan
Erskine Bowles (born 1945), American businessman and politician, chief of staff for President Clinton and co-author of the Simpson-Bowles Plan
Erskine B. Ingram (1866–1954), American businessman and philanthropist
E. Bronson Ingram II (1931–1995), American billionaire businessman and philanthropist
Erskine Caldwell (1903–1987), American author
Erskine Childers (author), 1870–1922, English-born novelist and Irish Republican
Erskine Hamilton Childers (1905–1974), fourth President of Ireland and Fianna Fáil minister
Erskine Hawkins (1914–1993), jazz trumpeter and big band leader, known for composing "Tuxedo Junction"
Erskine May, 1st Baron Farnborough (1815–1886), British constitutional theorist
Erskine Mayer (1889–1957), American major league baseball player
Erskine Ramsay (1864–1953), Alabama industrialist who opened savings accounts for parents who named their sons "Erskine"

Fictional people
 Dr. Abraham Erskine, in comics from Marvel Comics, the scientist responsible for the creation of Captain America
 Inspector Lewis Erskine, portrayed by Efrem Zimbalist, Jr. on the American TV series The F.B.I.
 Harry Erskine, a psychic played by Tony Curtis in the 1978 movie The Manitou
 Erskine Ravel, a character in the Skulduggery Pleasant series by Derek Landy

Other uses 
Erskine (automobile), a brand (marque) of automobile produced by the Studebaker Corporation from 1927 to 1930
Erskine College, South Carolina
Erskine Theological Seminary, South Carolina
Erskine Records, a British record label founded by Harry Styles
Erskine (charity), provides care for military veterans in Erskine, Scotland
Erskine May: Parliamentary Practice, rulebook on UK parliamentary procedure